Niki-Katerina Sidiropoulou (born 11 April 1974) is a Greek fencer. She competed in the women's épée events at the 1996 and 2004 Summer Olympics.

References

External links
 

1974 births
Living people
Greek female épée fencers
Olympic fencers of Greece
Fencers at the 1996 Summer Olympics
Fencers at the 2004 Summer Olympics
Sportspeople from Budapest
20th-century Greek women
21st-century Greek women